Daniel Alves da Silva (born 6 May 1983), known simply as Dani Alves, is a Brazilian professional footballer who last played as a right-back for Liga MX club UNAM and the Brazil national team. Widely considered one of the greatest full-backs of all time, Alves is the most decorated player in the history of professional football with 41 titles at senior level, and 43 official titles overall.

Starting his career at Bahia in 2001, Alves went on to have a successful six-year spell with Sevilla, winning two UEFA Cups and the Copa del Rey. He joined Barcelona for €32.5 million, becoming the third-most expensive defender of all-time at the time. He won the treble in his first season with the club and in the next season, won the Supercopa de España, UEFA Super Cup and the FIFA Club World Cup. Additionally, he helped the club to clinch another two Supercopa de España, five La Liga titles and two UEFA Champions League titles in the years that followed.

In 2016, Juventus signed Alves on a free transfer. He won the 2016–17 Serie A title and 2016–17 Coppa Italia in his only season with the side, also reaching the Champions League Final. In 2017, Alves joined French side Paris Saint-Germain on a free transfer, winning a domestic treble in his first season, followed by another league title the following season. In 2019, he returned to his home country, joining São Paulo, and winning the 2021 Campeonato Paulista with them. He returned to Barcelona in 2021. He joined Mexican club UNAM in 2022; UNAM terminated his contract in 2023 after he was detained in Spain, during a process that resulted in Alves being charged with sexual assault.

A full international for Brazil since 2006, Alves is the nation's second most-capped player of all time. He was included in their squads for three FIFA World Cups and five Copa América tournaments, winning the 2007 and 2019 editions of the latter competition, as well as the 2009 and 2013 FIFA Confederations Cups. At the Summer Olympics in 2020, he won a gold medal. Individually, Alves was named in the IFFHS CONMEBOL Team of the Decade (2011–2020), FIFA Confederations Cup Team of the Tournament (2013), the Copa América Team of the Tournament (2019), and was awarded the Copa América Best Player (2019).

Early life 

Alves was born in Juazeiro, a city in the Brazilian state of Bahia, to father Domingos Alves da Silva, a farmer. He played football with the neighboring kids. Alves' father had a passion for football as well, and eventually managed to organize his own football team. Alves, at age 6, started as a winger, but because of the lack of goals he scored, his father re-positioned him as a right back, a position he still plays up to this day. Alves worked as a farmer and a trader in his youth.

Club career

Bahia 
Alves made his professional debut for Bahia in a match against Paraná Clube for the 2001 Campeonato Brasileiro Série A. Bahia won 3–0, with Alves providing two assists and winning a penalty for the other goal. Head coach Evaristo de Macedo thereafter gave him a starting place in the team. In Bahia, he won the  Northeast Cup 2002. His consistently good performances landed him a transfer, at first on loan, to Spanish side Sevilla, midway through 2002.

Sevilla 

After 2002–03, on loan to Sevilla from Bahia, Alves travelled to play in the 2003 FIFA World Youth Championship, where he impressed as Brazil won the tournament. He was named the third-best player of the tournament and, after this, the Sevilla move was made permanent.

In June 2006, Sevilla agreed to sell Alves to Liverpool, but Liverpool were unable to match Sevilla's asking price of around £8 million. In December 2006, he signed a new contract with Sevilla, tying him to the club until 2012. He had a successful 2006–07 season, making 47 appearances and scoring 5 goals. He played in every one of Sevilla's UEFA Cup matches, in a competition which the club went on to win.

From his years in Spain, Alves acquired Spanish citizenship, thus allowing him to bypass any non-EU quota restrictions and exempting him from needing a work permit to play in any EU countries.

On 1 August 2007, Alves told SporTV he wanted to leave Sevilla for a European giant, later reiterating his desire to leave Sevilla to Marca, saying he was flattered by Chelsea's interest and that he could never turn down such an opportunity. In an interview with Antena 3 on 8 August, Alves confirmed his agent had been in England for some time handling Chelsea's offer, urging Sevilla to at least consider the offer.

On 16 August 2007, Sevilla rejected an unspecified Chelsea bid and, six days later, rejected another two bids from Chelsea, considering them to be "way below what was expected". Alves later revealed his dismay with Sevilla club president José María del Nido for having knocked back Chelsea's offers for his services after his move to Stamford Bridge collapsed, with Chelsea signing fellow Brazilian full back Juliano Belletti for a much lower fee.
After a public war of words between Alves and Del Nido, as well as the death of teammate Antonio Puerta, Alves decided to stay with Sevilla, with player and president ostensibly reconciled.

Barcelona 

On 2 July 2008, Alves joined Barcelona, leaving Sevilla in tears and saying he would love to play for the club again. He said he came to Sevilla as a boy and was leaving as a man. The official price of the transfer stood at £23 million up-front, with approximately £7 million more depending on a number of performance-related factors over the next few seasons of Alves' Barcelona career, making him one of the most expensive defenders in history and the third-most expensive player bought by Barça. He signed a four-year contract with Barcelona, which included a buy-out clause of €90 million.
Alves made his competitive and European debuts for Barcelona against Wisła Kraków in the 2008–09 UEFA Champions League third-round qualifiers on 13 August 2008. He made his La Liga debut in the Liga season-opener away to Numancia on 31 August 2008. Later on in his debut season, he missed the 2009 UEFA Champions League Final due to a yellow-card suspension, although Barcelona nonetheless defeated Manchester United 2–0 to complete the treble after also winning La Liga and the 2008–09 Copa del Rey.

In his second season at Barça, the club retained the Liga title and won the 2009 FIFA Club World Cup. In the 2010–11 season, Alves was instrumental in Barcelona's winning of their third consecutive Liga title.

On 28 May 2011, Alves played in his first Champions League final as Barcelona defeated Manchester United 3–1 at Wembley Stadium to win its fourth European Cup.

In 2011–12, Alves was part of a Barcelona team that won the Copa del Rey and the Club World Cup. In 2012–13, Alves won the Liga title for the fourth time in his five seasons at Barça.

In 2013–14, Alves wore shirt number 22, formerly worn by his friend Eric Abidal, to whom he offered to donate part of his liver during Abidal's treatment for liver cancer.

Banana incident 

On 27 April 2014, during a match at Villarreal's stadium, El Madrigal, Alves was targeted by a Villarreal supporter, who threw a banana at him. Alves picked up the banana, peeled it and took a bite. He responded to the incident by saying: 

Teammate Neymar's response – to post a photograph of himself on social media also eating a banana – went viral. Other footballers have also since taken photographs of themselves eating bananas. Cyrille Regis, who had been racially abused while a player in the 1970s and 1980s, expressed concern that the viral campaign would detract from the important issues of combating racism in the game. Alves said that whoever threw the banana at him should be publicly shamed, and on 30 April 2014, a man was arrested in connection with the incident. Villarreal were later fined €12,000 for the incident.

Third Champions League title 
On 6 June 2015, Alves started for Barça in the 2015 Champions League final as the club won its fifth European Cup by beating Juventus at the Olympiastadion in Berlin. This made Barcelona the first club in history to win the treble of domestic league, domestic cup and European Cup twice. Alves, Lionel Messi, Andrés Iniesta, Xavi, Gerard Piqué, Pedro and Sergio Busquets are the only players to have been a part of both treble-winning teams.

On 9 June 2015, Alves signed a two-year contract with Barcelona, keeping him at the club until 30 June 2017, with the option to extend a further year.

Final season 
After Barcelona were eliminated by compatriots Atlético Madrid in the quarter-finals of the 2015–16 UEFA Champions League, Alves recorded a "bizarre" video in which he impersonated his wife consoling him for the defeat, and posted it on Instagram; manager Luis Enrique subsequently dropped him from the following match against Valencia.

On 2 June 2016, Roberto Fernández, Barcelona's technical secretary, announced Alves was leaving Barcelona that summer after eight years. Although under contract until 30 June 2017, Alves contract had a clause allowing him to leave as a free agent.

Juventus 
On 27 June 2016, Juventus announced the signing of Alves on a two-year deal with the option of a third year. He made his Juventus debut on 20 August in a 2–1 home win over Fiorentina in Serie A. On 21 September, Alves scored his first goal with Juventus in a 4–0 home win over Cagliari, before opening his Champions League account with the club against Dinamo Zagreb six days later. On 27 November, he suffered a broken leg in Juventus' 3–1 defeat to Genoa. Alves made his return from injury as a substitute in a 1–0 Derby d'Italia win over Internazionale on 5 February 2017.

On 9 May 2017, Alves scored once and assisted a goal for Mario Mandžukić as Juventus defeated Monaco 2–1 to qualify for the 2017 Champions League final. Six days earlier, Alves had assisted both goals for Gonzalo Higuaín in the first leg of the tie at the Stade Louis II. On 17 May, Alves scored the opening goal of a 2–0 win over Lazio in the 2017 Coppa Italia Final. On 3 June, Alves appeared in his third UEFA Champions League final as Juventus were defeated 4–1 by Real Madrid at the Millennium Stadium in Cardiff.

On 29 June 2017, Alves had his contract with Juventus terminated by mutual consent. He made 33 appearances, winning the 2016–17 Serie A title and 2016–17 Coppa Italia in his one season in Turin.

Paris Saint-Germain 
On 12 July 2017, Alves joined French side Paris Saint-Germain on a free transfer, signing a two-year contract. He made his debut for the club on 29 July in the 2017 Trophée des Champions, scoring once and assisting the winning goal for Adrien Rabiot in a 2–1 victory over 2016–17 Ligue 1 champions Monaco. On 5 August, Alves assisted Edinson Cavani for PSG's first goal of the 2017–18 Ligue 1 season in a 2–0 win over Amiens at the Parc des Princes.

On 8 May 2018, he started in the 2018 Coupe de France Final, as PSG defeated Les Herbiers VF 2–0 to clinch the 2017–18 Coupe de France title; he came off in the 86th minute for Thomas Meunier, after sustaining an injury.

On 28 August 2018, Alves announced through a post on his Instagram page changing his squad number from 32 to 13 in tribute to Brazilian legend and four-time World Cup winner Mário Zagallo.

After his contract with the club expired on 30 June 2019, Alves became a free agent.

São Paulo 
On 1 August 2019, São Paulo announced the signing of Dani Alves on a contract that runs until December 2022. A lifelong supporter of São Paulo, Alves had previously on numerous occasions declared his wish of playing for the club. He was received at the Morumbi stadium, in front of 44,000 fans. Idols of the club's recent history, such as Hernanes, Kaká and Luís Fabiano were responsible for welcoming him.

Alves received the number 10 shirt upon his arrival. He made his debut on 18 August 2019, scoring the only goal in a 1–0 league win over Ceará at the Morumbi. Despite being a right-back throughout his career, he generally played in central midfield during his time at São Paulo, mainly during Fernando Diniz's tenure between 2019 and 2021. He was also made first team captain at the time of his arrival. In 2021, new manager Hernán Crespo made Alves return to a more defensive role, playing him as a right-sided wingback. At the same time, he gave the captain's armband to Miranda, who was returning to the club after a decade. In May, he won his only title with the club and the 42nd of his career, the Campeonato Paulista, which also ended São Paulo's 8-year trophyless period.

On 10 September 2021, Alves' representatives communicated to São Paulo that he would no longer return to training and subsequently play for the club following a dispute over unpaid image rights. His contract was terminated six days later.

Since then, São Paulo has agreed, in the same month, to pay Alves R$400,000 monthly over the next 5 years starting from January 2022. This is being done to cover the R$18 million debt at the time of the breakup, owing to the contract agreed in 2019, who São Paulo FC were increasingly unable to pay him then.

Return to Barcelona 
On 12 November 2021, Barcelona announced an agreement in principle to sign Alves on a deal until the end of the season. He only became available for the team's official matches starting January 2022. In December 2021, he made his second debut for the Blaugrana in a friendly, honoring Diego Maradona, match against Boca Juniors, and made his debut in official matches for the Blaugrana on 5 January 2022, in a Copa del Rey 2–1 win over Linares Deportivo. On 6 February 2022, he scored for the first time since returning, in Barças 4–2 home win over Atlético Madrid in the league; he also provided an assist for Jordi Alba and was sent off for a foul on Yannick Carrasco in the same match.

On 15 June 2022, Alves announced via a post on his Instagram account that he would leave Barcelona for the second time, having made 408 competitive appearances for the club in total, the second most by a player from abroad, with only Lionel Messi having played more.

 UNAM 
On 23 July 2022, Alves signed a one-year contract with Liga MX club UNAM.

For the 2022–23 Torneo Clausura, Alves decided to change his shirt number from 33 to 77.

On 20 January 2023, following his arrest for sexual assault allegation, UNAM decided to end Alves' contract with the club.

 International career 
 Early career and 2007 Copa América title 
Alves made his Brazil debut as a substitute in an unofficial friendly match against Kuwaiti club Al-Kuwait Selection on 7 October 2006. Three days later, he earned his first international cap in a friendly against Ecuador. He was included in Brazil's team for the 2007 Copa América. He appeared in four matches including the final against Argentina on 15 July, where he gave an assist to Roberto Ayala's own goal and scored a goal himself in the 3–0 victory.

 2009 Confederations Cup title, 2010 World Cup, and 2011 Copa América 
Despite being the most expensive right-back in history at the time, he was initially unable to hold down a regular starting spot in the Brazilian national team, with Maicon being the first choice ahead of him. Alves came on as a substitute in the 2009 FIFA Confederations Cup semi-final against South Africa and scored the winner, a free-kick and a goal in the 88th minute in a 1–0 win. The following summer, he was named to Brazil's squad for the 2010 FIFA World Cup. He scored another long-range free-kick against Iran on 7 October 2010. The following year, Alves was included in Brazil's 23-man squad for the 2011 Copa América in Argentina.

 2013 Confederations Cup title and 2014 World Cup 

Alves was part of the 23 players called by coach Luiz Felipe Scolari to play in the 2013 FIFA Confederations Cup on home soil. He started in Brazil's 3–0 victory over Spain in the final on 30 June, at the Maracanã Stadium.

On 7 May 2014, Alves was named to Brazil's squad for the 2014 FIFA World Cup on home soil. He lost his position as a starter during the competition due to poor performances. After Brazil defeated Colombia 2–1 in the quarter-finals, Alves and teammate David Luiz were applauded for comforting James Rodríguez, an act they were both commended for by both Rodríguez and the media for showing respect.

 2015 Copa América, and Copa América Centenario, and 2018 World Cup qualifying 
Alves was picked as a starter in both the 2015 and Centenario Copa América tournaments by manager Dunga. He retained his position following the appointment of Tite and helped Brazil secure qualification for the 2018 FIFA World Cup, but was ruled out of the tournament due to a knee injury suffered in the 2018 Coupe de France Final.

 2019 Copa América title 
In May 2019, he was included in Brazil's 23-man squad for the 2019 Copa América on home soil. He went on to replace Neymar as Brazil captain for the tournament. In the team's final group match against Peru in São Paulo on 22 June, Alves scored in a 5–0 win, which saw Brazil advance to the quarter-finals. In the final, on 7 July, at the Maracanã Stadium, Brazil faced Peru once again, and won the match 3–1 to win the title; Alves was subsequently named the Most Valuable Player of the tournament. The 2019 edition of the Copa América was the 40th title of his career.

 2020 Summer Olympics 
On 17 June 2021, Alves was named in the Brazil squad for the 2020 Summer Olympics. In the final, Brazil faced Spain and won the gold medal following a 2–1 victory after an extra time goal by Malcom. At 38, he became the oldest footballer to ever win a medal in the men's Olympic football tournament, and the third oldest player overall behind Ryan Giggs in 2012 and Ricardo Piccinini in 1988.

 2022 FIFA World Cup 
On 7 November 2022, at age 39, Alves was named in the squad for the 2022 FIFA World Cup.

By starting in his side's final group stage fixture against Cameroon, Alves became the oldest ever player to feature in a World Cup match for Brazil, at the age of 39 years and 210 days.

 Style of play 

Regarded as one of the best full-backs of his generation, and of all time, Alves is an offensive right-back or wing-back who is known in particular for his pace, stamina, overlapping attacking runs, and technical skills, which also enable him to play in midfield, or as a winger; he is also gifted with good crossing accuracy and distribution, which allows him to link up with midfielders, and makes him an effective assist provider along the right flank. In addition to his ability to create chances, he is an accurate striker of the ball, and is known for his ability to score goals in particular from outside the area or long-range set-pieces.

Despite not being particularly imposing physically, he possesses significant strength and tenacity, which along with his energy, anticipation and work-rate, enable him to intercept passes or chase down and press opponents when not in possession, thus allowing him to aid his team both offensively and defensively. However, despite his skill and offensive ability, he has drawn criticism at times in the media for neglecting the defensive aspect of his game.

During his time with Paris Saint-Germain, he also played as a central midfielder on occasion. He continued to play in a free role in midfield during his time with São Paulo, citing his desire to play in the middle in order to have more touches on the ball as the reason for this tactical switch, as out wide he had felt more isolated, and less capable of creating chances for his team. Regarding his unique interpretation of the full-back role throughout his career, Alves commented in 2019:

 Personal life 
On 29 September 2011, Alves was appointed as a Special Olympics Ambassador for its Global Football program, charged with promoting respect and inclusion in football for people with intellectual disabilities, particularly in the run up to the 2014 World Cup.

Along with his ex-teammate turned rapper, José Manuel Pinto, Alves released a song called "Suave" on YouTube on 15 June 2018.

In September 2021, Alves indicated he was a supporter of Jair Bolsonaro after posting slogans in favor of the Brazilian president.

That same year, Alves was appointed as an Earthshot Prize council member, an environmental initiative led by Prince William, Duke of Cambridge.

In addition to his native Portuguese, Alves also speaks English and Spanish.

 Sexual assault charges 
On 20 January 2023, Alves was arrested by Spanish police and remanded in custody without bail on charges of sexual assault.    The alleged assault occurred at a Barcelona nightclub on 30 December 2022. The complainant had filed an official complaint on 2 January 2023. El Periódico de Catalunya reported that the complainant alleged to police and in court that after a waiter led her to meet Alves at the nightclub's VIP area, Alves twice made her touch his penis against her will, then ordered her to follow him into the nightclub's bathroom, prevented her from leaving the bathroom, threw her onto the ground, slapped her, tried to force her to fellate him, put her against the sink, then moved her to the toilet, raped her and ejaculated. According to El Periódico, semen that matched Alves' DNA was collected from samples from inside the complainant's vagina, from her underwear, from her dress, and from the bathroom floor; the complainant was documented by a hospital to have suffered a knee injury consistent with her allegations; and investigators found seven fingerprints around the bathroom that matched the complainant's account of events, with the complainant giving her account without knowing that investigators had such evidence.

Alves has given at least three different accounts of the incident. El Periódico detailed three versions. In the first version, Alves told media outlet Antena 3 that he did not know the woman, and accused her of trying to become famous by making her allegation. He implied that he entered the bathroom not knowing that she was already inside using it, but this was contradicted by surveillance footage. After understanding that evidence had been collected against him and the above account was part of the evidence, Alves changed his story in court. In the second version, Alves admitted that he had entered the bathroom first before the woman, and that inside the bathroom, he had defecated in the toilet with the woman beside him, and nothing sexual occurred. When Alves was questioned on why the woman would remain in the small bathroom with him for 15 minutes doing nothing, on why his semen had been found on the bathroom floor, Alves changed his story again. In the third version, he said that the woman had performed fellatio on him in the bathroom. Separately, Antena 3 quoted journalist Carlos Quílez as saying that Alves has admitted penetrating the woman.

 Career statistics 

 Club 

Notes:

 International 

Scores and results list Brazil's goal tally first, score column indicates score after each Alves goal.

 Honours Bahia Copa do Nordeste: 2002Sevilla Copa del Rey: 2006–07
 Supercopa de España: 2007
 UEFA Cup: 2005–06, 2006–07
 UEFA Super Cup: 2006Barcelona La Liga: 2008–09, 2009–10, 2010–11, 2012–13, 2014–15, 2015–16
 Copa del Rey: 2008–09, 2011–12, 2014–15, 2015–16
 Supercopa de España: 2009, 2010, 2011, 2013
 UEFA Champions League: 2008–09, 2010–11, 2014–15
 UEFA Super Cup: 2009, 2011, 2015
 FIFA Club World Cup: 2009, 2011, 2015Juventus Serie A: 2016–17
 Coppa Italia: 2016–17Paris Saint-Germain Ligue 1: 2017–18, 2018–19
 Coupe de France: 2017–18
 Coupe de la Ligue: 2017–18
 Trophée des Champions: 2017São Paulo Campeonato Paulista: 2021Brazil Copa América: 2007, 2019
 FIFA Confederations Cup: 2009, 2013Brazil OlympicSummer Olympics: 2020Brazil U20 FIFA World Youth Championship: 2003Individual FIFA U-20 World Cup Bronze Ball: 2003
 UEFA Cup Most Valuable Player: 2005–06
 UEFA Team of the Year: 2007, 2009, 2011, 2015, 2017
 ESM Team of the Year: 2006–07, 2008–09, 2009–10, 2010–11, 2011–12
 FIFA FIFPro World11: 2009, 2011, 2012, 2013, 2015, 2016, 2017, 2018
 La Liga Defender of the Season: 2008–09
 FIFA Confederations Cup Team of the Tournament: 2013
 La Liga Team of the Season: 2014–15
 France Football World XI: 2015
 Serie A Team of the Year: 2016–17
 IFFHS Men's World Team: 2017
 UNFP Ligue 1 Team of the Year: 2017–18
 Copa América Golden Ball: 2019
  Copa América Team of the Tournament: 2019
 IFFHS CONMEBOL Team of the Decade: 2011–2020
 Campeonato Paulista Team of the Tournament: 2020Records'
 Most UEFA Super Cup titles: (4) (shared with Paolo Maldini) (2006, 2009, 2011, 2015)
 Most UEFA Super Cup final appearances: (5) (shared with Paolo Maldini) (2006, 2007, 2009, 2011, 2015)

See also 
 List of footballers with 100 or more UEFA Champions League appearances
 List of men's footballers with 100 or more international caps
 List of men's footballers with the most official appearances
 List of FC Barcelona players (100+ appearances)
 List of La Liga players (400+ appearances)
 List of world association football records

References

External links 

 
 
 
 
 
 
 
 

1983 births
Living people
People from Juazeiro
Brazilian footballers
Association football fullbacks
Association football midfielders
Esporte Clube Bahia players
Sevilla FC players
FC Barcelona players
Juventus F.C. players
Paris Saint-Germain F.C. players
São Paulo FC players
Club Universidad Nacional footballers
Campeonato Brasileiro Série A players
La Liga players
Serie A players
Ligue 1 players

UEFA Cup winning players
UEFA Champions League winning players
Outfield association footballers who played in goal
Brazil under-20 international footballers
Brazil international footballers
Olympic footballers of Brazil
2007 Copa América players
2009 FIFA Confederations Cup players
2010 FIFA World Cup players
2011 Copa América players
2013 FIFA Confederations Cup players
2014 FIFA World Cup players
2015 Copa América players
Copa América Centenario players
2019 Copa América players
Footballers at the 2020 Summer Olympics
2022 FIFA World Cup players
Copa América-winning players
FIFA Confederations Cup-winning players
FIFA Century Club
Naturalised citizens of Spain
Brazilian expatriate footballers
Brazilian expatriate sportspeople in Spain
Brazilian expatriate sportspeople in Italy
Brazilian expatriate sportspeople in France
Brazilian expatriate sportspeople in Mexico
Expatriate footballers in Spain
Expatriate footballers in Italy
Expatriate footballers in France
Expatriate footballers in Mexico
Olympic medalists in football
Olympic gold medalists for Brazil
Medalists at the 2020 Summer Olympics
Sportspeople from Bahia